Our Modern Maidens is a 1929 American silent comedy-drama film directed by Jack Conway. Starring Joan Crawford in her last silent film role, the film also stars Rod La Rocque, Douglas Fairbanks Jr., and Anita Page. Our Modern Maidens has no audible dialog, but features a synchronized soundtrack and sound effects.

Plot
Heiress Billie Brown (Crawford), is engaged to marry her longtime sweetheart, budding diplomat Gil Jordan (Fairbanks).  When Billie goes to see senior diplomat Glenn Abbott (La Rocque) about ensuring that Gil get a favorable assignment, Billie and Glenn are undeniably attracted to one another.  Gil is likewise attracted to Kentucky Strafford (Page), Billie's houseguest, who becomes pregnant by Gil.  Gil finds that he loves Kentucky, but marries Billie instead.  Once Billie realizes that Kentucky is pregnant with Gil's child, their marriage is annulled and both are paired up with the people they truly love.

Cast
 Joan Crawford...Billie Brown
 Rod La Rocque...Glenn Abbott aka "Dynamite"
 Douglas Fairbanks Jr...Gil Jordan
 Anita Page...Kentucky Strafford
 Josephine Dunn...Ginger
 Edward Nugent...Reg 
 Albert Gran...B. Bickering Brown

Box office
According to MGM records the film earned $675,000 in the US and Canada and $182,000 elsewhere resulting in a profit of $248,000.

Accolades
The film was nominated for the American Film Institute's 2002 list AFI's 100 Years...100 Passions.

References

External links
 
 
 
 

1929 films
1929 comedy-drama films
1920s pregnancy films
American silent feature films
American black-and-white films
1920s English-language films
Films directed by Jack Conway
Metro-Goldwyn-Mayer films
Transitional sound comedy-drama films
Films scored by Arthur Lange
Early sound films
Surviving American silent films
1920s American films
American pregnancy films
Silent American comedy-drama films